Ophiderma definita is a species of treehopper in the family Membracidae. They can be found between March and June in the Central and Eastern regions of the United States and Canada.

These insects are quite small, males growing between 5–5.5 mm and females growing between 4–5 mm.

References

External links

 

Insects described in 1919
Smiliinae